The Whitehead Baronetcy, of Highfield House in Catford Bridge in the County of Kent, is a title in the Baronetage of the United Kingdom. It was created on 26 November 1889 for James Whitehead, Lord Mayor of London between 1888 and 1889 and later member of parliament for Leicester. His younger son, the third baronet, was also a Member of Parliament.

Whitehead baronets of Highfield House, Berkshire (1889) 
Sir James Whitehead, 1st Baronet (1834–1917)
Sir George Hugh Whitehead, 2nd Baronet (1861–1931)
Sir Rowland Edward Whitehead, 3rd Baronet (1863–1942)
Sir Philip Henry Rathbone Whitehead, 4th Baronet (1897–1953)
Sir Rowland John Rathbone Whitehead, 5th Baronet (1930–2007)
Sir Philip Henry Rathbone Whitehead, 6th Baronet (born 1957)

Notes

Whitehead